Ewan Gordon McKendrick (born 1960) is Professor of English Private Law at the University of Oxford. He is known for his academic work on the law of contract, as well as publications in the law of unjust enrichment and commercial law.

Life
McKendrick was educated at the University of Edinburgh, where he studied law, and Pembroke College, Oxford, where he obtained a Bachelor of Civil Law degree (BCL). After lecturing at the Central Lancashire Polytechnic, University of Essex and London School of Economics, he returned to Oxford in 1991 as a Fellow of St Anne's College. In 1995, he became Professor of English Law at University College London.  He was called to the bar as a member of Gray's Inn in 1998 and was appointed a Bencher in 2009. He left UCL in 2000 to become Herbert Smith Professor of English Private Law at Oxford University, a post that is associated with a fellowship at Lady Margaret Hall.  He became a Pro-Vice-Chancellor of the university in 2006. He became Registrar of the University of Oxford on 1 January 2011. In 2015, he was appointed an honorary Queen's Counsel.

Publications
Articles

Books
Goode on Commercial Law (Penguin 2010)
Contract Law (14th edn Macmillan 2021)
Interests in Goods (with Norman Palmer) (Lloyd's of London Press 1998)
Product Liability in the Construction Industry (with Norman Palmer) (Lloyd's of London Press 1993)
Force Majeure and Frustration of Contract (Routledge 1995)

See also
English contract law

Notes

1960 births
Living people
Academics of the London School of Economics
Academics of the University of Central Lancashire
Academics of the University of Essex
Academics of University College London
Alumni of Pembroke College, Oxford
Alumni of the University of Edinburgh
British barristers
English lawyers
Fellows of Lady Margaret Hall, Oxford
Fellows of St Anne's College, Oxford
Members of Gray's Inn
Pro-Vice-Chancellors of the University of Oxford
Registrars of the University of Oxford
Statutory Professors of the University of Oxford
Legal scholars of the University of Oxford
Honorary King's Counsel